Ekk Deewana Tha may refer to:

 Ekk Deewana Tha, a 2012 Indian film
 Ekk Deewana Tha (soundtrack), a soundtrack by A.R. Rahman
 Ek Deewaana Tha, a 2017 Indian TV series